DakhaBrakha is a Ukrainian folk music quartet which combines the musical styles of several ethnic groups.

DakhaBrakha is a project of the Dakh Contemporary Arts Center, led by Vladyslav Troitskyi and born as a live theater music crew. Troitskyi continues to be the band's producer. Members of DakhaBrakha participate in the centre's other projects, notably in the all-female cabaret project Dakh Daughters, as well as in the annual Gogolfest festival.

Name etymology 
The group's name derives from Ukrainian verbs Давати and Брати, meaning "give" and "take", respectively – while also playing on the Art Centre's name "Dakh" (literally "roof" in Ukrainian).

Members 
 Marko Halanevych – vocals, goblet drum, tabla, didgeridoo, harmonica, accordion, cajón, jaw harp 
 Olena Tsybulska – vocals, percussion
 Iryna Kovalenko – vocals, djembe, flute, buhay, piano, ukulele, zgaleyka, accordion
 Nina Garenetska – vocals, cello

All of the members except Marko Halanevych are graduates of the Kyiv National University of Culture and Arts. Nina Garenetska also takes part in the Dakh Daughters project.

Discography 
 На добраніч (2005) 
 Ягудки (2007) 
 На межі (2009)
 Light (2010)
 Хмелева project (2012)
 Шлях / The Road (2016)
 Alambari (2020)

Soundtracks 
 2018 – Trailer song for House 99, David Beckham's grooming brand (United Kingdom)
 2017 – Bitter Harvest (Canada)
 2017 – Mavka. The Forest Song (Ukraine)
 2017 – Fargo (United States)

Origin 

DakhaBrakha was originally a daughter project of Ukrainian avant-garde theater, Dakh, and its artistic director, Vladislav Troitsky.

Festivals 
DakhaBrakha performed in June 2014 at the Bonnaroo Music and Arts Festival held in Manchester, Tennessee. DakhaBrakha was invited to participate through the globalFEST showcase. They were proclaimed by ''Rolling Stone as "Best Breakout" of the festival.

They played at the Glastonbury Festival on the West Holts. They performed in July 2017 and July 2018 at the Finger Lakes GrassRoots Festival of Music and Dance held in Trumansburg, New York. In 2019, they performed at the Michael Schimmel Center for the Arts in Manhattan.

They performed during the first weekend of the 2022 New Orleans Jazz & Heritage Festival in New Orleans, Louisiana. 

DakhaBrakha played a well received set at the Festival International de Louisiane in Lafayette, La on April 30th 2022.

References

External links 

 
 
 "Вибухова хвиля на ім'я «ДахаБраха»", article at myradio.ua 

Ukrainian folk musicians
Ukrainian musical groups